Varanus macraei, the blue-spotted tree monitor or blue tree monitor, is a species of monitor lizard found on the island of Batanta in Indonesia. It is named after herpetologist Duncan R. MacRae, founder of the reptile park Rimba on Bali.

Geographic range
The distribution of V. macraei is restricted to the island of Batanta, on the northwestern tip of the Vogelkop peninsula of Irian Jaya of Indonesia. There this species lives like its relatives, the other members of the prasinus-group, as a tree climber, which is clearly visible by the prehensile tail. This may be the smallest distribution of any tree monitor, as this island has a size of only 450 km2, which is comparable with Lake Constance of Central Europe.

Habitat
The blue-spotted tree monitor inhabits tropical forests that average . In the dry season the humidity is around 65%, but it spikes to 100% in the wet season.

Description

Varanus macraei is part of the prasinus-group and the subgenus (Hapturosaurus). As its common names suggest, it is black with scattered blue scales, forming ocellations that may in turn form bands across the back. The tip of the snout is light blue and the lower jaw is white with uniform green scales along the neck, forming a v-shaped pattern. There are less than 9 dorsal crossbands and the legs are heavily spotted with turquoise ocelli. There are 85–103 scale rows at midbody. A single distinct blue scale row stretches from the lower angle of the eye to the upper edge of the ear. Its throat is light with dark spots forming a reticulated pattern. Like all members of the prasinus-group, with 22–23 more or less symmetrical blue rings, the tail is prehensile and about 1.95 times as long as the snout-vent length (SVL). Male blue-spotted monitors reach a larger maximum size than female blue-spotted monitors, and they can be distinguished by the comparatively broader temporal region and distinct hemipenal bulges posterolateral to the cloaca. Adult male blue-spotted monitors may reach  in total length, and female blue-spotted monitors are about  shorter than the male blue-spotted monitors, making V. macraei the largest known species of the V. prasinus complex.

Behavior and diet
This species is diurnal and arboreal thus it avoids predators by fleeing up a tree and keeping the trunk between itself and the intruder, as many anoles do. Currently no studies have been published on the matter, however the diet of V. macraei is likely primarily made up of (in order) stick insects, orthopterans (grasshoppers, katydids and crickets), moths, beetles, smaller lizards, small eggs, and the occasional berry.

History
As recently as a decade ago, only five species comprised the tree monitor group: Varanus prasinus, V. beccarii, V. bogerti, V. keithhornei, and V. telenesetes. In the early years of the 21st century, that number has been supplemented with the discoveries and naming of V. macraei, V. boehmei, and V. reisingeri. The considerable similarity among these species made them difficult to differentiate. Some individuals of the decidedly green V. prasinus have very little yellow pigmentation, and thus appear pale blue. Varanus reisingeri can very well be described as looking like V. prasinus without blue pigmentation. While there are very few reports — and no specific field studies — relating to the natural history of any of the tree monitors, there is a considerable body of knowledge available for the green tree monitor (V. prasinus) and the black tree monitor (V. beccarii), two of the species that have been very successfully maintained and bred in captivity for more than two decades. Consequently, several herpetoculturists and at least two zoos, such as the Cincinnati Zoo and the Virginia Zoo, have now kept and bred the blue-spotted monitor (V. macraei).

Varanus macraei is sought after for the international pet trade. Illegal and unsustainable collection and trade of Varanus macraei is causing a decline in the wild population and is likely a threat to the long term survival of this species in the wild. As Vanarnus macraei is a protected species in Indonesia, there is no legal collection of the species from the wild.

References

Further reading
Böhme W, Jacobs HJ (2001). "Varanus macraei sp. n., eine neue Waranart der V. prasinus-Gruppe aus West Irian, Indonesien ". Herpetofauna 23 (133): 5-10. (Varanus macraei, new species). (in German).
 

Varanus
Reptiles of Indonesia
Endemic fauna of Indonesia
Reptiles described in 2001
Taxa named by Wolfgang Böhme (herpetologist)